Stephen Creek is an  tributary of the Great Egg Harbor River in southeast New Jersey in the United States.

See also
List of rivers of New Jersey

References

Rivers of New Jersey
Tributaries of the Great Egg Harbor River
Wild and Scenic Rivers of the United States